Lutraria oblonga, common name the oblong otter shell, is a species of large saltwater clam, a marine bivalve mollusc in the family Mactridae.

Description
Lutraria oblonga has a shell that can grow to a length of 11–15 cm.

<div align=center>
Right and left valve of the same specimen:

</div align=center>

Distribution
L. oblonga is present in the North African coast of the Mediterranean Sea, in the Red Sea and in the eastern coast of Africa.

References
 WoRMS
 Encyclopedia of Life
 Marine species identification

External links
 Aphotomarine
 Conchology
 Marmoreus.free

Mactridae
Bivalves described in 1791